Mashobane KaMangethe (c. late 18th century – c. 1820s) was a South African witch doctor and cattle herder.

Mashobane, son of chief Mangethe (Zikode), was the chief of the Khumalo tribe: a clan of Nguni people living near the Black Umfolozi river in kwaZulu, in South Africa, and was the father of Mzilikazi the founder of the Ndebele (Matabele) kingdom in Zimbabwe. Matshobana married his first wife, Nompethu KaZwide, who gave birth to Mzilikazi in 1790. It is said that when Mashobane was in charge of a regiment invading a neighbouring tribe he was caught and had his arm amputated and was later set free.

In the early 19th century the Khumalo came under pressure to join the Ndwandwe nation due to the expanding power of the Ndwandwe chief, Mashobane's father-in-law, Zwide kaLanga. The alliance was uneasy, and the Khumalos sought help from the leader of the Mthethwa kingdom, Dingiswayo, and his protégé Shaka Zulu.

In the course of an attempted invasion of Zwide's territory, Dingiswayo was captured and put to death by Zwide. Shaka Zulu escaped capture only through the help of Chief Donda Khumalo, as a result of which Zwide ordered the deaths of all three Khumalo chiefs, Beje, Donda and Mashobane.

Beje was the only one to escape, Donda was killed and Mashobane was taken captive along with his son, Mzilikazi. In the end Zwide ordered Mashobane to be executed, while Mzilikazi became a lieutenant of Shaka Zulu before leaving him to form the Ndebele kingdom in what is now Zimbabwe.

In the 1986 South African TV series, Shaka Zulu, Mashobane was beheaded by Ndwandwe soldiers and his head given to the Sangoma Queen Ntombazi of the Ndwandwe who was Zwide's mother. Ntombazi was a feared wizard. Ntombazi had warned her son, Zwide about keeping Mashobane's head as that will bring misfortune into the Ndwandwe Kingdom. Indeed misfortune befell the kingdom as she had warned. The Ndwandwe kingdom was attacked, destroyed and Ntombazi was killed. Zwide's sons were killed, and his generals fled.

External links
 Profile and history of Matshobana Chief of the Khumalo and father of Mzilikazi

History of Zimbabwe
19th-century monarchs in Africa
19th-century African people
Year of death missing
Year of birth missing